Racquetball (Spanish: Ráquetbol), for the 2018 South American Games was held from 27 May to 3 June 2018 in Cochabamba, Bolivia.

Tournament format
The 2018 South American Games racquetball competition has two parts. The individual competitions in Men’s and Women’s Singles and Doubles, and a Team competition. The individual competitions will be held first beginning on May 27 and concluding on June 1. Three of the individual competitions will have a group stage followed by an elimination stage to determine the medalists. The exception is Men’s Doubles, which will be a five country round robin competition. The Team competition will be June 2 and 3. The racquetball venue is Complejo Polifuncional de Sarco.

Participating nations
  (3)
  (7)
  (3)
  (4)
  (5)
  (3)

Medal summary

Medal table

Medalists

Men’s singles

Preliminary round
Pool A

Pool B

Pool C

Medal round

Men’s doubles

Men's team

Quarterfinal

Semifinals

Final

Women’s singles

Preliminary round
Pool A

Pool B

Pool C

Medal round

Women’s doubles

Preliminary round

Medal round

Women's team

Semifinals

Final

References

External links
Results

2018 South American Games events
2018
South American Games
Qualification tournaments for the 2019 Pan American Games
Racquetball at multi-sport events